The Machines We Are is the second full-length studio album released by Dead and Divine. It was released on August 4, 2009. The video for "Neon Jesus" was released in September 2009.

Track listing
 "The Sugar Sickness" - 3:49
 "Creature" - 4:10
 "Chemical Valley" - 2:43
 "Neon Jesus" - 3:13
 "D.R.U.G.S." - 2:44
 "For Your Health" - 1:36
 "Teeth" - 3:40
 "Mechanical Orchestra" (featuring Blake Prince of Straight Reads the Line) - 3:28
 "Lovely Bones" - 5:22
 "Cassandra Syndrome" - 9:21

Personnel
Vocals: Matt Tobin
Guitars: Chris Le-Masters
Drums: Kyle Anderson
Bass: Kellan Lindsay
Produced by Eric Ratz & Garth Richardson
Engineered and Mixed by Eric Ratz
Editor: Dajaun Martineau
Tech: Alan "Yeti" Riches
Layout and design by Sons of Nero

2009 albums
Dead and Divine albums
Albums with cover art by Sons of Nero